Teri Meri Love Story (or TMLS for short) is a 2016 Pakistani romantic-comedy, action film directed by Jawad Bashir. It is also written by Jawad Bashir and co-written by Ahmed Abdul Rehman. It was co-produced and distributed by Summit Entertainment, Hum Films. The film has Mohib Mirza, Ushna Shah, Omar Shahzad, Uzma Khan, Mohsin Abbas Haider and Salman Shahid in lead roles.

Plot 

The film's plot resolves around Esha (Ushna Shah), a beautiful, stylish TV host who is on an adventurous shooting assignment accompanied by her shooting crew and friends, the goofy and mischievous Sherry (Mohsin Abbas), Uzma Khan and Danish (Ahmad Abdul Rehman). Esha wants to marry her true love Ramis (Omer Shahzad) but her father (Salman Shahid) is adamant that she marries her childhood family friend Nael (Mohib Mirza). TMLS follows the trio's adventurous and hilarious journey to finding true love.

Cast 
 Mohib Mirza as Nael
 Ushna Shah as Esha
 Omar Shahzad as Ramis
 Uzma Khan as Mona
 Mohsin Abbas Haider as Sherry
 Salman Shahid as Rana Saheb
 Laila Zuberi as Baby Aunty
 Ahmed Abdul Rehman as Danis
 Ahsan Rahim as Don Goga
 Jawad Bashir as Don Bali
 Faisal Qureshi as Don Raju
 Hassan Khan as Gulfam

Production

Filming
Jawad Bashir confirmed to the press that the film's shooting was done by using aerial lens and anamorphic tools, which is a first for a Pakistani film. The film was shot against the breathtaking backdrops of Naran Valley & lake Saif-ul-Muluq.
While Mr. Waryyam Iqbal of Summit Entertainment stated that his company was committed in promoting a softer image of Pakistan by producing such movie ventures which would promote young talent.

Release
The trailer was released on July 22, 2016. The film was released on September 2, 2016 in cinemas across Pakistan.

Box office 
The film struggled at the Box Office and managed to collect only 85,00,00 (85 Lac) Rupees domestically.

See also
 List of Pakistani films of 2016

References

External links
 

Pakistani romantic comedy films
Summit Entertainment films
2016 romantic comedy films